Cheilinus is a genus of fish in the family Labridae native to the Indian and Pacific Ocean.

Species
There are currently seven recognized species in this genus:
 Cheilinus abudjubbe Rüppell, 1835 (Abdujubbes wrasse)
 Cheilinus chlorourus (Bloch, 1791) (Floral wrasse)
 Cheilinus fasciatus (Bloch, 1791) (Red-breasted wrasse)
 Cheilinus lunulatus (Forsskål, 1775) (Broom-tail wrasse)
 Cheilinus oxycephalus Bleeker, 1853 (Snooty wrasse)
 Cheilinus trilobatus Lacépède, 1801 (Triple-tail wrasse)
 Cheilinus undulatus Rüppell, 1835 (Hump-head wrasse)

The white-barred wrasse (Cheilinus quinquecinctus) is treated as a synonym of Cheilinus fasciatus by Fishbase.

References

 
Labridae
Taxa named by Bernard Germain de Lacépède
Marine fish genera
Extant Coniacian first appearances